Ngarindo Milengar is a member of the Pan-African Parliament from Chad.

See also
 List of members of the Pan-African Parliament

References

Living people
Members of the Pan-African Parliament from Chad
Year of birth missing (living people)